Polyblastidium is a genus of foliose lichens in the family Physciaceae. It has 18 species. The genus was circumscribed by German lichenologist Klaus Kalb in 2015, with Polyblastidium japonicum assigned as the type species. Polyblastidium is similar in morphology to Heterodermia, but its lower surface is cobweb-like in structure (arachnoid), and its ascospores are mostly 1-septate with 1 to 3 sporoblastidia (small subsidiary cavities). It is this latter feature that is referenced in the genus name Polyblastidium (poly = "many" + sporoblastidia). The genus contains several species that were formerly classified in the genus Anaptychia (section Polyblastidium series Polyblastidium).

Species

Polyblastidium appendiculatum 
Polyblastidium casarettianum 
Polyblastidium chilense 
Polyblastidium corallophorum 
Polyblastidium dendriticum 
Polyblastidium fragilissimum 
Polyblastidium hypocaesium 
Polyblastidium hypoleucum 
Polyblastidium japonicum 
Polyblastidium magellanicum 
Polyblastidium microphyllum 
Polyblastidium neglectum 
Polyblastidium propaguliferum 
Polyblastidium queenslandicum 
Polyblastidium squamulosum 
Polyblastidium subneglectum 
Polyblastidium togashii 
Polyblastidium violostriatum

References

Caliciales
Lichen genera
Taxa described in 2015
Caliciales genera
Taxa named by Klaus Kalb